Edelson Robson dos Santos (born 28 January 1983), known as Robinho, is a Russian professional futsal player who plays as a winger for the Russia national team.

Honours
Action 21 Charleroi
Belgian Futsal Division 1: 2003–04
UEFA Futsal Cup: 2004–05
Gazprom-Ugra Yugorsk
Russian Futsal Super League: 2014–15
Russian Cup: 2015–16
UEFA Futsal Cup: 2015–16
Benfica
Campeonato Nacional: 2018–19
Taça da Liga: 2017–18, 2018–19, 2019–20
International
FIFA Futsal World Cup: Runner-up 2016
UEFA Futsal Championship: Runner-up 2014, 2016; Third-place 2018

References

External links
FIFA profile
AMFR profile 
Gazprom UGRA profile 

1983 births
Living people
Futsal forwards
Brazilian men's futsal players
Russian men's futsal players
Russian people of Brazilian descent
Naturalised citizens of Russia
S.L. Benfica futsal players
Brazilian expatriate sportspeople in Belgium
Russian expatriate sportspeople in Portugal